Saskatoon—Grasswood is a federal electoral district in Saskatchewan, Canada, that has been represented in the House of Commons of Canada since 2015. It encompasses most of the portions of Blackstrap (93%) and Saskatoon—Humboldt (7%) that had been located in the city of Saskatoon.

Saskatoon—Grasswood was created by the 2012 federal electoral boundaries redistribution and was legally defined in the 2013 representation order. It came into effect upon the call of the 42nd Canadian federal election, on October 19, 2015. It is borders by 4 other ridings, Moose Jaw—Lake Centre—Lanigan to the south and east, Carlton Trail—Eagle Creek to the north-east and west, Saskatoon—University to the north, and Saskatoon West to the north-west.

Members of Parliament
This riding has elected the following Members of Parliament:

Election results

References

External links
 Elections Canada

Saskatchewan federal electoral districts
Politics of Saskatoon